Loda Niemirzanka, real name Leokadia Niemira (23 November 1909 – 14 August 1984) was a Polish film actress. She appeared in fourteen films between 1931 and 1939.

Selected filmography
 Księżna Łowicka (1932)
 Jaśnie pan szofer (1935)
 Będzie lepiej (1936)
 Rena (1938)

References

External links

1909 births
1984 deaths
Polish film actresses
Polish stage actresses
Actresses from Warsaw
Polish female dancers
Polish emigrants to the United Kingdom
20th-century Polish actresses